Susan Weld may refer to:

 Susan Roosevelt Weld
 Susan Ker Weld, better known as Tuesday Weld